Čerkezi is a village in the municipality of Kumanovo, North Macedonia.

Demographics
According to the statistics of Bulgarian ethnographer Vasil Kanchov from 1900 the settlement is recorded as Čerkezko Selo as having 120 inhabitants, all Circassians recent emigrants who survived the Circassian Genocide.As of the 2021 census, Čerkezi had 3,137 residents with the following ethnic composition:
Albanians 3,027
Persons for whom data are taken from administrative sources 99
Turks 5
Macedonians 3
Others 3

According to the 2002 census, the village had a total of 3,741 inhabitants. Ethnic groups in the village include:
Albanians 3,719
Macedonians 2
Bosniaks 4
Others 16

References

External links

Villages in Kumanovo Municipality
Albanian communities in North Macedonia